Zoljenah (named after Zuljanah; also known as Peykaap I or IPS-16) is a class of fast torpedo boat operated by the Navy of the Islamic Revolutionary Guard Corps. It is described a stealth craft whose unusual armament suggests a "ship-disabling role".

History 
IPS-16 boats were purchased from North Korea in the early 2000s. The first six were reportedly delivered to Iran on 8 December 2002, aboard freighter Iran Meead. Iran then reverse engineered the boat and has been able to produce it domestically.

Design

Dimensions and machinery 
It uses one surface piercing propeller, powered by two diesel engines.

Armament 
Zoljenah-class boats are equipped with a 12.7mm machine guns, but their primary armament is two single 324mm torpedo tubes.

References

External links 
 Profile at globalsecurity.org
 Profile at cmano-db.com 

Iran–North Korea military relations
Fast patrol boat classes of the Navy of the Islamic Revolutionary Guard Corps
Torpedo boat classes
Ships built by Marine Industries Organization